

France
 Louisiana –
 Antoine Laumet de La Mothe, sieur de Cadillac, Governor of Louisiana (1713–1716)
 Jean-Baptiste Le Moyne, Sieur de Bienville, Governor of Louisiana (1716–1717)
 Saint-Domingue – Louis de Courbon, comte de Blénac, Governor-General of Saint-Domingue (1714–1717)

Great Britain
 Bombay – Charles Boone, Governor of Bombay (1715–1722)
 Massachusetts – 
William Tailer, Acting Governor of Massachusetts Bay Colony (1715–1716)
 Samuel Shute, Governor of Massachusetts Bay Colony (1716–1723)

Oman
 Mombasa – Nasr ibn Abdallah al-Mazru‘i, Wali of Mombasa (1698–1728)

Portugal
 Angola – João Manuel de Noronha, Governor of Angola (1713–1717)
 Macau – D.Francisco de Alarcao Sotto-Maior, Governor of Macau (1714–1718)

Netherlands
 Dutch East Indies – Christoffel van Swoll, Governor-General of the Dutch East Indies (1713–1718)
 Zeylan – 
Hendrik Bekker, Governor of Zeylan (1707–1716)
Isaak Augustyn Rumpf, Governor of Zeylan (1716–1723)

Colonial governors
Colonial governors
1716